Mehmet Ruhi Su (1912 – 20 September 1985) was a Turkish opera singer, Turkish folk singer and saz virtuoso of probable Armenian origin.

Early life
Mehmet Ruhi Su was born 1912 in Van. He later expressed his situation: "He is one of the children desolated by the World War I." After he lost his family during World War I at a very early age, he was taken from Van to Adana and given to a childless poor family. After living with the family, he was taken to Dârüleytâm, an orphanage that was built in Adana for the Armenian orphans.

He graduated from the Kuleli Military High School in 1931.

Musical background
He started playing violin at the age of ten. In 1936 he graduated from the Teacher's School of Music and in 1942 from the Opera Department of State Conservatory in Ankara. The following ten years, he performed at the State Opera in Ankara as a celebrated bass baritone, appearing in operas such as Madame Butterfly, Fidelio, Tosca and Rigoletto. During his contemporary music education, he also studied Turkish folk music and consequently made regular radio programs, playing saz and singing folk songs, while he worked at the opera.

Political arrest
In 1952 he was arrested, accused of being a member of the banned Turkish Communist Party, and imprisonment for five years, which ended his career in the opera. After serving his sentence for a "thought crime", he dedicated himself to folk music in his unique way.

Folk studies
While he roamed all over Anatolia from one village to another, he started compiling numerous folk songs. Then, he rearranged and performed them using western techniques. His western music career formed the basis of his approach to interpreting and performing traditional Turkish music. He argued that the authentic music should not be imitated as it is found locally but rather elaborated into a national music with the enriching support of the international music, perceiving it as a contemporary of Atahualpa Yupanqui and Pete Seeger.

Ruhi Su combined his efforts of creating a national awareness of the rich Anatolian culture with his compositions based on texts of Sufi poets Yunus Emre and Pir Sultan Abdal and other Anatolian poets like Köroğlu (see Epic of Köroğlu), Karacaoğlan, and Dadaloğlu.

Choir effort
He established and trained a choir in the 1970s and conducted them in many concerts and recordings. The Friends Choir (Dostlar Korosu) that he established in 1975 continues to keep his voice, his music of the heart and his songs alive.

Views
His approach in bringing forth the ignored suffering of the oppressed and his love of humankind in his musical work has gained a great respect and support from his audience and had a deep effect on many musicians, who paved the path to a more open-minded society.

He told people's longings in their own language and he conveyed the fire in their heart to everyone and the society with his instrument and his avid voice throughout his life, he was considered dangerous and treacherous. He loved his people in a way unsuitable to government. Because he was a socialist and the cold war began. It was different then. People who saw and spoke of 40 years ago, what everyone sees and tells today were considered dangerous and treacherous. The laws and the mechanisms of Cold War grinded those who adopted a socialist outlook of life. Though dangerous and treacherous, Ruhi Su was not alone. Ruhi Su was a member of Turkish Workers Party (TİP). He married Sidika Su during his 5 years in prison. He became a father in exile.

Death

Ruhi Su died on 20 September 1985 and was buried at the Zincirlikuyu Cemetery in Istanbul. His wife Sıdıka Su died on 18 October 2006. His son Ilgin Ruhi Su lives in Istanbul. In 2009, his gravestone was shot by unknown parties.

Albums 
(1972) Seferberlik Türküleri Ve Kuvayi Milliye Destanı
(1972) Yunus Emre
(1972) Karacaoğlan
(1972) Pir Sultan Abdal
(1974) Şiirler – Türküler
(1974) Köroğlu
(1977) El Kapıları
(1977) Sabahın Sahibi Var

After his death
(1986) Pir Sultan'dan Levni'ye
(1987) Kadıköy Tiyatrosu Konseri I
(1987) Kadıköy Tiyatrosu Konseri II
(1988) Beydağı'nın Başı
(1988) Dadaloğlu Ve Çevresi
(1989) Huma Kuşu Ve Taşlamalar
(1990) Sultan Suyu "Pir Sultan Abdal'dan Deyişler"
(1990) Ruhi Su performs Sufi Hymns by Yunus Emre and Pir Sultan Abdal
(1991) Dostlar Tiyatrosu Konseri (Sümeyra Çakır İle Birlikte)
(1992) Ankara'nn Taşına Bak
(1993) Semahlar
(1993) Çocuklar, Göçler, Balıklar
(1993) Zeybekler
(1993) Ezgili Yürek
(1993) Ekin İdim Oldum Harman
(1993) Uyur İken Uyardılar
(1994) Barabar
(1995) Aman Of

References

Notes

Ahmet Günlük 1990 HITEK Traditional Turkish Folk Music Through The Centuries – Ruhi Su performs Sufi Hymns by Yunus Emre and Pir Sultan Abdal

External links
 Ruhi Su ile Birlikte Kırk Yıl: Sıdıka Su – web page 

1912 births
1985 deaths
Burials at Zincirlikuyu Cemetery
Turkish folk poets
20th-century Turkish male opera singers
Turkish Marxists
Deaths from cancer in Turkey
Deaths from prostate cancer
People from Van, Turkey